Following is a list of all Article III United States federal judges appointed by President Abraham Lincoln during his presidency. In total Lincoln appointed 32 Article III federal judges, including 4 Associate Justices and 1 Chief Justice to the Supreme Court of the United States, and 27 judges to the United States district courts. Lincoln appointed no judges to the United States circuit courts during his time in office.

In 1863, the United States Circuit Court for the District of Columbia, which had existed since 1801, was abolished. The Supreme Court of the District of Columbia (now the United States District Court for the District of Columbia) was established in its place with 1 Chief Justice and 3 Associate Justices, all 4 positions being filled by Lincoln. These 4 positions are included in the 27 District Judges appointed by Lincoln.

Lincoln appointed 4 judges to the United States Court of Claims, an Article I tribunal. He later laterally reappointed 1 of those judges as Chief Justice of the same court.

United States Supreme Court justices

District courts

Specialty courts (Article I)

United States Court of Claims

Notes

Renominations

References
General

 

Specific

Sources
 Federal Judicial Center

Lincoln

Presidency of Abraham Lincoln
Abraham Lincoln-related lists